Laura Esther Ghislaine Flippes (born 13 December 1994) is a French handballer for Paris 92 and the French national team.

Achievements
Championnat de France:
Winner: 2014, 2016, 2017
Coupe de France:
Winner: 2015, 2017
Coupe de la Ligue :
Winner: 2014
Individual Awards

 All-Star Team as best Right Wing at the Olympic Games: 2020

References

External links

1994 births
Living people
Sportspeople from Strasbourg
French female handball players
European champions for France
Handball players at the 2020 Summer Olympics
Medalists at the 2020 Summer Olympics
Olympic medalists in handball
Olympic gold medalists for France